Nathaniel Levi (1830–1908) was a Liverpool born Victorian politician and businessman.

He arrived at Hobson's Bay in April 1854 in the Matilda Wattenbach.

Levi was prominent in the Jewish community, president of the Melbourne Hebrew Congregation in 1880–82 and 1904–05.

Levi was the first Jewish member of a state parliament in Australia and is a forebear of prominent rabbi, John Levi.

References

.

1830 births
1908 deaths
Politicians from Liverpool
English Jews
Australian Jews
Australian people of English-Jewish descent
English emigrants to colonial Australia
Members of the Victorian Legislative Assembly
Members of the Victorian Legislative Council
19th-century Australian politicians